Nirbhaya Vahini is a volunteer unit of the Honour for Women National Campaign. It was founded in January 2014 to help mobilize public opinion and launch a sustained campaign for the implementation of the movement’s Four-Point charter of demand.

Composition 
Nirbhaya Vahini is composed of thousands of volunteers drawn from all states of India. The volunteers range from working women, housewives to students.

Four-Point Charter of Demand 
1.	Complete clamp down on liquor trade 

2.	Self-defence training for women as part of educational curriculum

3.	Special protection force for women security in every district

4.	Fast-track court and special investigating & prosecuting wing in every district

References

Feminist organisations in India
Violence against women in India
Third-wave feminism
Human rights organisations based in India